Helena Christina van de Pavord Smits (1867-1941) was a Dutch botanical illustrator.

Biography
Pavord Smits was born on 21 October 1867 in Leiden, Netherlands. She attended the Academie van Beeldende Kunsten, Den Haag (Royal Academy of Art, The Hague. She studied with Jan Philip Koelman, and Mathilde Frederika Wilhelmina Tonnet. She worked as an illustrator for the journal "Flora Batava" and  the Rijksherbarium te Leiden (National Herbarium of the Netherlands).

Pavord Smits died on 27 January 1941, in Leiden.

Gallery

References

External links

1867 births
1941 deaths
People from Leiden
Botanical illustrators
Dutch women artists